In mathematics, modular symbols, introduced independently by Bryan John Birch and by , span a vector space closely related to a space of modular forms, on which the action of the Hecke algebra can be described explicitly.  This makes them useful for computing with spaces of modular forms.

Definition

The abelian group of (universal weight 2) modular symbols is spanned by symbols {α,β} for α, β in the rational projective line Q ∪ {∞} subject to the relations

 {α,β} + {β,γ} = {α,γ}

Informally, {α,β} represents a homotopy class of paths from α to β in the upper half-plane. 

The group GL2(Q) acts on the rational projective line, and this induces an action on the modular symbols. 

There is a pairing between cusp forms f of weight 2 and modular symbols given by integrating the cusp form, or rather fdτ, along the path corresponding to the symbol.

References

Modular forms